Niemen Aerolit is Czesław Niemen's album recorded in 1975 with his new band "Aerolit".

Track listing 
 "Cztery ściany świata" - 10:24 (lyrics Jonasz Kofta)
 "Pielgrzym" - 9:22 (lyrics Cyprian Kamil Norwid)
 "Kamyk" - 7:16 (lyrics Zbigniew Herbert)
 "Daj mi wstążkę błękitną" - 4:14 (lyrics Cyprian Kamil Norwid)
 "Smutny Ktoś i biedny Nikt" - 7:19 (lyrics Maria Pawlikowska-Jasnorzewska)

Personnel 
 Czesław Niemen - vocal, moog, mellotron
 Sławomir Piwowar - guitars
 Jacek Gazda - bass
 Andrzej Nowak - electric piano
 Piotr Dziemski - drums

References 

Czesław Niemen albums
1975 albums